The GS-1 was a class of conventional 4-8-4 "Northern" type steam locomotive operated by the Southern Pacific Railroad (SP) and its Texas subsidiary the Texas and New Orleans Railroad (T&NO) from 1930 to 1956.  A total of fourteen were built by the Baldwin Locomotive Works, numbered 4400 through 4409 by SP and 700 through 703 by T&NO.  GS stands for "Golden State" or "General Service."

History
The GS-1s were assigned to various passenger trains throughout the SP system, and ended their careers on the San Jose-San Francisco Peninsula Commute service.

No GS-1 locomotives survive.

Fleet details

References

Bibliography

Further reading

GS-1
4-8-4 locomotives
Baldwin locomotives
Passenger locomotives
Railway locomotives introduced in 1930
Steam locomotives of the United States
Scrapped locomotives
Standard gauge locomotives of the United States